Face to Face is the 1996 self-titled third studio album by the California punk band Face to Face.

Track listing
All songs written by Trever Keith, except where noted.
 "Resignation" - 3:48
 "Walk the Walk" (Keith, Scott Shiflett) - 3:35
 "Blind" - 2:43
 "Ordinary" - 2:48
 "I Won't Lie Down" (Keith, Shiflett) - 3:17
 "Can't Change the World" - 2:13
 "Handout" (Keith, Shiflett) - 3:37
 "Everything's Your Fault" - 2:49
 "Take It Back" - 2:59
 "Complicated" (Keith, Chad Yaro) - 4:02
 "Put You in Your Place" - 3:42
 "Falling" - 3:01

Personnel
 Trever Keith – vocals, guitar
 Chad Yaro – guitar, vocals
 Scott Shiflett – bass, vocals
 Rob Kurth – drums, vocals

Miscellaneous
the track, "I Won't Lie Down" was covered by Christian rock band Spoken on their album Echoes of the Spirit Still Dwell, and Israeli punk band Man Alive on their 2007 EP Access Denied! A remixed version of "I Won't Lie Down" was also a part of the soundtrack for the movie Mortal Kombat: Annihilation. "Blind" was covered by American punk rock band Rise Against on the album Long Forgotten Songs: B-Sides & Covers 2000–2013.

References

Face to Face (punk band) albums
1996 albums
A&M Records albums